Bhesa robusta is a species of plant in the Centroplacaceae family. It is found in India, Indonesia, Malaysia, Myanmar, Singapore, Thailand, Vietnam, and possibly Bhutan.

References

robusta
Least concern plants
Taxonomy articles created by Polbot